Pazo dos Deportes de Lugo is a multi-purpose sports arena in Lugo, Galicia, Spain.

It is owned by Lugo provincial government. The arena serves as the home of the basketball team Club Baloncesto Breogán.

References

External links
 Pazo dos Deportes at Google Maps

CB Breogán
Indoor arenas in Spain
Basketball venues in Spain
Sports venues in Galicia (Spain)